Acleris lacordairana is a species of moth of the family Tortricidae. It is found in Germany, Austria, Switzerland, Italy, Hungary, Poland, Estonia, Latvia and Russia. In the east, the range extends to Japan.

The wingspan is 16–18 mm. Adults are on wing from June to September.

The larvae feed on Ulmus and Salix species.

References

Moths described in 1836
lacordairana
Moths of Asia
Moths of Europe